Eberhardt August Wilhelm von Zimmermann (August 17, 1743, Uelzen – July 4, 1815, Braunschweig) was a German geographer and zoologist.

He studied natural philosophy and mathematics in Leiden, Halle, Berlin, and Göttingen, and in 1766 was appointed professor of mathematics and natural sciences at the  Collegium Carolinum in Braunschweig. One of his pupils was mathematician Carl Friedrich Gauss. From 1789 onward, he served as aulic councillor in Braunschweig.

During his career, he travelled widely throughout Europe — Livonia, Russia, Sweden, Denmark. England, France, Germany, Switzerland, and Italy. On his journeys, he conducted research of economic conditions and natural resources. He wrote Specimen Zoologiae Geographicae Quadrupedum (1777), one of the first works on the geographical distribution of mammals (zoogeography).

In 1794, he was elected to the American Philosophical Society in Philadelphia, Pennsylvania.

He was the author of works on a variety of subjects, such as mathematics, natural sciences, regional studies, and the history of discovery. From 1802 to 1813, he published the Taschenbuch der Reisen (Handbook of Travel).

Published works 
 Geographische Geschichte des Menschen und der allgemein verbreiteten vierfüssigen Thiere, 3 volumes (1779–1783) – [Geographical history of humans and the general distribution of quadrupeds].
 Über die Elastizität des Wassers, 1779 – [On the elasticity of water].
 
 Frankreich und die Freistaaten von Nordamerika, (part I, 1795; part II, 1800) – [France and the free states of North America].  
 Die Erde und ihre Bewohner. Ein Lesebuch für Geographie, Völkerkunde, Produktenlehre und den Handel, 5 volumes (1810–1814) – [The earth and its inhabitants. A reading book of geography, ethnology, etc].

References
Biography in Allgemeine Deutsche Biographie (in German)
Petra Feuerstein-Herz, 2004  Eberhard August Wilhelm von Zimmermann (1743-1815) und die Tiergeographie. Dissertation Braunschweig.

External links
Zoologica Göttingen State and University Library

German geographers
18th-century German zoologists
Academic staff of the Technical University of Braunschweig
Honorary members of the Saint Petersburg Academy of Sciences
People from Uelzen
1743 births
1815 deaths